Tillandsia streptocarpa is a species of flowering plant in the Bromeliaceae family. This species is native to Bolivia, Peru, Argentina, Paraguay, and Brazil.

Cultivars
 Tillandsia 'Blue Moon'
 Tillandsia 'Pacific Blue'
 Tillandsia 'Van Der Mollis'

References

streptocarpa
Flora of South America
Plants described in 1887
Taxa named by John Gilbert Baker